David R. Munson (born 1942) is an American politician.

Munson obtained his B.A. degree from Sioux Falls College and M.A. degree from Augustana College. For eight and a half years, he taught school. From 1977 to 1983, Munson worked as an independent insurance agent. He retired from CitiBank in December 2001 after 20 years with the bank as its government affairs officer.
 
In 1978, he was elected to represent Minnehaha County in the South Dakota State House of Representatives. In 1981, Munson became Republican precinct committee-man. From 1983–84, he was House majority whip. His tenure in the state house ended in 1996, as he won a seat on the South Dakota Senate, representing the 10th district until his resignation on May 17, 2002. He served as mayor of Sioux Falls, South Dakota between 2002 and 2010. Finance controversies took their toll on the mayor; and on February 2, 2006, Munson decided not to seek re-election. After dropping out of the mayoral race, his supporters convinced him to re-enter. This proved to be the correct choice for Munson who won by a small margin of just under 900 votes over challenger Bruce Halverson. He left the office of Mayor in May 2010 due to term limits. He was succeeded by Mike Huether.

Munson was the subject of a number of skits on The Caribou Show. He is a former member of the Mayors Against Illegal Guns Coalition. His split from the group was well-publicized.

References

External links
Dave Munson's record in the South Dakota Legislature's historical listing

Mayors of Sioux Falls, South Dakota
Republican Party members of the South Dakota House of Representatives
Republican Party South Dakota state senators
1942 births
Living people
Date of birth missing (living people)
Place of birth missing (living people)
University of Sioux Falls alumni
Augustana University alumni
21st-century American politicians
Schoolteachers from South Dakota
20th-century American politicians
Citigroup employees
American businesspeople in insurance